The 1988 UCLA Bruins football team represented the University of California, Los Angeles in the 1988 NCAA Division I-A football season. The team was led by 13th-year head coach Terry Donahue and played its home games at the Rose Bowl in Pasadena, California. They were members of the Pacific-10 Conference.

Schedule

Roster

Season summary

Nebraska

Oregon State

at Oregon

USC

vs. Arkansas (Cotton Bowl)

Rankings

Awards and honors
 Troy Aikman, Davey O'Brien Award

NFL draftees
The following players were selected in the 1989 NFL Draft.

References

UCLA
UCLA Bruins football seasons
Cotton Bowl Classic champion seasons
UCLA Bruins football